Ravic R. Huso is a retired American diplomat who served as Ambassador to Laos from 2007 until 2010.

Education
In 1973, Huso graduated from the College of Idaho and earned a Master's Degree in International Relations from the University of Virginia in 1976. The State Department sent him to the United States Army War College where he graduated with the Class of 1993.

References

Living people
Ambassadors of the United States to Laos
College of Idaho alumni
University of Virginia alumni
United States Army War College alumni
Year of birth missing (living people)